Satellite is the second single from Guster's 2006 album Ganging Up on the Sun. The song received support from U.S. alternative rock radio, but failed to chart on the Modern Rock Tracks chart. There was also a Satellite EP released April 10, 2007. The song is also featured in the 2007 film Martian Child. The stop motion video for the song, directed by Adam Bizanski, was released on February 2, 2007.

The single would go on to earn the band its first gold record in 2018.

Track listing

Satellite EP:
"Satellite"
"G Major"
"Rise & Shine"
"Timothy Leary"
"I'm Through"
"Satellite" (The Astronauts remix)
"Two of Us" (Live At KCRW)
"Total Eclipse of the Heart" (Live At The State Theater, Portland, ME)

Satellite Promo:
"Satellite (Single Version)"
"Satellite (Album Version)"

References

External links
http://www.imdb.com/title/tt0415965/soundtrack
 Satellite official video on Youtube

Guster songs
2007 singles
2006 songs
Reprise Records singles